Believe is the eighth studio album by American singer Yolanda Adams. It was released by Elektra Records on December 4, 2001, in the United States. The album features the singles "Never Give Up," and "I'm Gonna Be Ready". The track "Fo' Sho'" was done with labelmate Karen Clark-Sheard and was Sheard's first release after her near death experience. The first track, "Never Give Up", is said to be a response to the September 11 attacks. The album sold 67,000 copies at first week, and was certified Gold by the Recording Industry Association of America (RIAA). This was Adams' final release on Elektra before the company folded.

Critical reception

Allmusic editor Liana Jonas found that "most of the fare on Believe [is] plagued by formulaic R&B and gospel arrangements, predictable key changes and progressions, and less-than-moving lyrics. The album does not justly showcase Adams' fullest vocal potential, which, to be sure, she has in spades based on past recordings. Adams should secure better songwriters and producers. Without them, her many talents go wasted. She can and should do better."

Track listing
Credits taken from the album's liner notes.

Notes
  denotes co-producer

Charts

Weekly charts

Year-end charts

Certifications

References

External links
 

Yolanda Adams albums
2001 albums
Albums produced by Jimmy Jam and Terry Lewis
Albums produced by Warryn Campbell
Elektra Records albums